The 7th constituency of Haute-Garonne is a French legislative constituency in the Haute-Garonne département.

Geography

The borders of the constituency were changed in 2010 and again in 2017.  Since 2017 it consists of
the Canton of Auterive, (except for the commune of Lafitte-Vigordane) and the communes
Lherm,
Aignes,
Le Fauga,
Frouzins,
Labastidette,
Lavernose-Lacasse,
Muret,
Saint-Clar-de-Rivière,
Saint-Hilaire,
Seysses,
Venerque,
Vernet,
Cugnaux and
Villeneuve-Tolosane

Deputies

Election Results

2022

 
 
 
 
 
 
 
 
|-
| colspan="8" bgcolor="#E9E9E9"|
|-

2017

2012

2007

 
 
 
 
 
 
 
|-
| colspan="8" bgcolor="#E9E9E9"|
|-

2002

 
 
 
 
 
 
 
|-
| colspan="8" bgcolor="#E9E9E9"|
|-

1997

 
 
 
 
 
 
|-
| colspan="8" bgcolor="#E9E9E9"|
|-

References

7